Silver & Gold is the 23rd studio album by Canadian / American musician Neil Young, released on April 25, 2000. Many of these songs were written in the late 1990s, though the title track was written in 1981; by his own estimation, he had been trying to get "the take" on this song for around ten years.

The album was a nominee for Roots & Traditional Album of the Year – Solo at the 2001 Juno Awards. The album art is a photo taken by Neil's daughter Amber with the Game Boy Camera.

The U.S. release uses HDCD encoding.

Track listing
All songs composed by Neil Young

Personnel
Neil Young – guitar, piano, harmonica, vocals
Ben Keith – pedal steel guitar, vocals
Spooner Oldham – piano, Hammond organ
Donald Dunn – bass
Jim Keltner – drums
Oscar Butterworth – drums
Linda Ronstadt – vocals
Emmylou Harris – vocals

Charts

References

Neil Young albums
2000 albums
Reprise Records albums
Albums produced by Neil Young
Albums produced by Ben Keith